Natalia Magnicaballi is a principal ballet dancer with the Suzanne Farrell Ballet and Ballet Arizona.

Early life and education
Magnicaballi was born in Buenos Aires, Argentina where she began her ballet training at the age of seven under the tutelage of Mercedes Serrano and Wasil Tupin. At the age of nine she was accepted to study at the Instituto Superior de Arte of the Teatro Colón, where she later graduated with the best qualifications.

Career
She became a principal dancer at the age of 19 with Julio Bocca's Ballet Argentino under the direction of Lidia Segni. In Europe she joined the Italian company Aterballetto under Mauro Bigonzetti's direction. Magnicaballi is a principal dancer with the Suzanne Farrell Ballet since 1999 and Ballet Arizona since 2002.

Her classical repertoire includes Odette/Odile in Swan Lake, Kitri/Mercedes in Don Quixote, Swanilda in Coppélia, The Sugar Plum Fairy in The Nutcracker, Titania in Midsummer Night's Dream, Juliet in Romeo & Juliet and the title roles in Raymonda (Act. III), Paquita, La Sylphide and Giselle.

Magnicaballi's Balanchine repertoire includes the lead roles in: Tzigane, Don Quixote, Duo Concertante, La Sonnambula, Divertimento No 15, Apollo, Slaughter on Tenth Avenue, Agon, “Rubies” and “Diamonds” from Jewels, Allegro Brillante, Serenade, Bugaku, Ballade, Meditation, Four Temperaments, Who Cares?, Liebeslieder Walzer, Episodes, La valse, Stravinsky Violin Concerto and Robbins’ Afternoon of a Faun.

Her contemporary repertoire includes works by renowned choreographers like: Jiri Kylian, Roland Petit, Mauro Bigonzetti, Dwight Roden, Christopher Wheeldon, Ib Andersen, Oscar Araiz, Alberto Mendez, Mauricio Wainrot, Ana María Stekelman, José Antonio Ruiz, Gustavo Mollajoli, Julio Lopez y Vittorio Biagi.

She toured and performed in the main houses and arena theatres around five continents including the Paris Opera Garnier and the Mariinsky Theatre and danced in outdoor performances in front of more than 100,000 people in Buenos Aires.  She was named one of "25 to Watch" by Dance Magazine in 2005 and named the “Best Dancer” of the State of Arizona by The Arizona Republic.

References

External links
 Natalia Magnicaballi's official site
 The Suzanne Farrell Ballet's official site
 Ballet Arizona's official site
 The Kennedy Center for the Performing Arts' official site

Prima ballerinas
Argentine ballerinas
People from Buenos Aires
Living people
Year of birth missing (living people)
Instituto Superior de Arte alumni